Mohamed Cheik Ali Touré, known as Mozino (born 30 March 1997) is an Ivorian professional footballer who plays for Portuguese club Trofense as a right winger.

Club career
On 1 July 2019, signed his first professional contract with Aves. Touré made his professional debut with Aves in a 1-0 Primeira Liga loss to Santa Clara on 4 January 2020.

References

External links

ZeroZero Profile

1997 births
Footballers from Abidjan
Living people
Ivorian footballers
Association football wingers
Cultural Leonesa footballers
U.D. Oliveirense players
C.D. Aves players
C.D. Trofense players
Segunda División B players
Campeonato de Portugal (league) players
Primeira Liga players
Liga Portugal 2 players
Ivorian expatriate footballers
Expatriate footballers in Spain
Ivorian expatriate sportspeople in Spain
Expatriate footballers in Portugal
Ivorian expatriate sportspeople in Portugal